For You is the third studio album by American country music band Parmalee. It was released on July 30, 2021, via Stoney Creek Records.

Content 
"Just the Way", featuring Blanco Brown, was released as the lead single on December 13, 2019. It has been certified Platinum by the RIAA and MC. Its second single, "Take My Name", was released on October 4, 2021.

Critical reception 
Stephen Thomas Erlewine of AllMusic praised the album as a "seamless piece of a product" in which the band don't simply "harmonize on sweet, sticky melodies."

Commercial performance 
For You debuted at number 35 on the Top Country Albums chart in 2021 and number 43 on the Independent Albums chart.  It reached a peak of #24 in June 2022.

Track listing

Personnel 
Adapted from For You liner notes.

Parmalee
Barry Knox - background vocals
Josh McSwain - piano, synthesizer, background vocals
Matt Thomas - lead vocals, background vocals

Scott Thomas, Parmalee's drummer, does not play on this album.

Additional Musicians
Avery Anna - duet vocals and background vocals on "Forget You"
Kevin Bard - acoustic guitar, programming
Kenny Barnes - programming
Eli Beaird - bass guitar
Blake Bollinger - programming
Blanco Brown - duet vocals on "Just the Way"
Corey Crowder - acoustic guitar
Kris Donegan - acoustic guitar, electric guitar
David Fanning - programming
Michael Fitzpatrick - percussion, duet vocals, and background vocals on "Greatest Hits"
Andrew Goldstein - acoustic guitar, keyboards, programming
Kenny Greenberg - electric guitar
Mark Hill - bass guitar
Evan Hutchings - drums, percussion
King 80 Industries - programming
Ben Johnson - programming
Zach Kale - programming, background vocals
Sol Philcox-Littlefield - electric guitar
Matt McGinn - background vocals
Pat McGrath - acoustic guitar
James McNair - background vocals
Rob McNelley - electric guitar
Miles McPherson - drums
Luke Moseley - piano
Sweet Legacy Music - programming
Justin Ostrander - electric guitar
Michael Rinne - bass guitar
Jeff Roach - piano
Scotty Sanders - steel guitar
Justin Schipper - steel guitar
Bryan Sutton - acoustic guitar
Ilya Toshinsky - acoustic guitar, electric guitar
Justin Wilson - background vocals
Alex Wright - keyboards, piano

Chart performance

Release history

References 

2021 albums
Parmalee albums
BBR Music Group albums